Spreckels Theatre is a performing arts center located in San Diego, California. It was touted as "the first modern commercial playhouse west of the Mississippi". It was designed for philanthropist John D. Spreckels, and was meant to commemorate the opening of the Panama Canal. Built in 1912, it was originally created to host live theater performances, but was converted to allow motion pictures in 1931. It has been in continuous operation since its opening, with a few brief intervals for refurbishing.

Architecture

Architect Harrison Albright designed the Spreckels Theater for the city's premier philanthropist, sugar heir John D. Spreckels. The building, which opened on August 23, 1912, was constructed to commemorate the opening of the Panama Canal. As with many west coast buildings from this era, it is constructed of reinforced concrete and concrete panels with architectural terra cotta manufactured by Gladding, McBean. The six-story building has a marquee over the main entrance.  The theater is a 1,915-seat auditorium with an ornate Baroque interior. The auditorium is open with no pillars or columns to obstruct sightlines.  The number of seats was chosen to correspond with the Panama-California Exposition year (1915). The stage is 82 feet x 58 feet, and was one of the largest stages ever constructed.

History

The theater originally presented live theatrical productions. Notable performers at the Spreckels included Enrico Caruso, John Barrymore, Al Jolson, Will Rogers, and Abbott and Costello.

In 1931, it was converted into a first-run motion picture house by its then-owner Louis B. Metzger.

In 1976, owner/operator Jacquelyn Littlefield (Metzger's daughter) restored it to a live theater format, bringing touring Broadway shows to San Diego in cooperation with the Nederlander Organization.

When fire destroyed San Diego's Old Globe Theatre in 1978, the Spreckels hosted the Globe's 1978-79 season.

Every July since 2015 (except for 2020), TBS has rented the theater for a week for Conan O'Brien to host his self-titled talk show from the theater to correspond with that year's San Diego Comic Con. There are four tapings that occur, which each episode airing the following evening. Casts from several big name television shows have appeared such as Breaking Bad, Top Gun: Maverick, Veronica Mars, and It Chapter Two.

Today

 
San Diego's Spreckels Building was listed on the National Register of Historic Places in 1975. It continues to operate as a theater.

Past Performers
 Arcade Fire
 Cocteau Twins
 George Arliss
 William Powell
 Bill Bojangles Robinson
 Ronald Coleman
 Arthur Rubinstein
 Bela Lugosi
 Ed Wynn
 Bert Lahr
 Ronald Reagan
 Eva La Gallienne
 Honi Coles
 Carol Shelly
 Jean Pierre Rampal
 Julian Bream
 Burt Lancaster
 Chris Issak
 Ricky Lee Jones
 Bobby Caldwell
 Kenny Loggins
 Linda Lavin
 Jamie Foxx
 Jeffrey Osborne
 David Bowie
 Bryan Adams
 Dave Koz
 The Doobie Brothers
 Todd Rungren
 Sammy Hagar
 Chaka Kahn
 Sarah McLachlan
 Bela Flek
 Alice Cooper
 Fiona Apple
 Hootie and The Blowfish
 Smashing Pumpkins
 David Sanborn
 John Cleese
 Dave Chappelle
 Margaret Cho
 Lisa Lampenelli
 David Brenner
 Eddie Griffin
 Ghost
 Ellen DeGeneres
 George Lopez
 Rita Rudner
 The D’Oyly Carte Opera Company
 The Martha Graham Dance Company
 The Royal Shakespeare Company
 The Moscow Art Theatre, Ballet Folklorico de Mexico
 The Paul Whiteman Orchestra
 The Kirov Ballet
 The Alvin Alley Dance Company
 The Harlem Boys Choir

References

Buildings and structures in San Diego
National Register of Historic Places in San Diego
Theatres on the National Register of Historic Places in California
Culture of San Diego
Event venues established in 1912
1912 establishments in California
Performing arts centers in California